The administrative county of Carmarthen and the first Carmarthenshire County Council was established in 1889 under the Local Government Act 1888. The first elections were held in January 1889.

The council was headquartered in Llandovery until it moved to Carmarthen in 1907. Construction of a new County Hall started in 1939 but, due to the World War, was not completed until 1955.

Elections
 1889 Carmarthenshire County Council election
 1892 Carmarthenshire County Council election
 1895 Carmarthenshire County Council election
 1898 Carmarthenshire County Council election
 1901 Carmarthenshire County Council election
 1904 Carmarthenshire County Council election
 1907 Carmarthenshire County Council election
 1910 Carmarthenshire County Council election
 1913 Carmarthenshire County Council election
 1946 Carmarthenshire County Council election

Dissolution
The county council was abolished under the Local Government Act 1972 on 1 April 1974, with the creation of Dyfed. A new unitary authority of Carmarthenshire was later established, as a result of the Local Government (Wales) Act 1994, which came into force on 1 April 1996.

References

County councils of Wales
Local government in Carmarthenshire
1889 establishments in Wales
1974 disestablishments in Wales